Marie Hrachová (born 12 November 1963) is a female former Czech international table tennis player.

Table tennis career
She won a silver medal at the 1985 World Table Tennis Championships in the mixed doubles with Jindřich Panský.

She competed in the 1988 Summer Olympics and 1992 Summer Olympics.

See also
 List of table tennis players
 List of World Table Tennis Championships medalists

References

Czech female table tennis players
1963 births
Living people
Olympic table tennis players of Czechoslovakia
Table tennis players at the 1988 Summer Olympics
Table tennis players at the 1992 Summer Olympics
Sportspeople from Ostrava
World Table Tennis Championships medalists